Speedy Death is a 1929 mystery detective novel by the British writer Gladys Mitchell. It introduced the character of Mrs Bradley who would go on to appear in a further sixty five novels. The title is sometimes written as A Speedy Death.

It was loosely adapted for an episode of the 1998 television series The Mrs Bradley Mysteries.

Synopsis
Psychoanalyst and amateur detective Mrs Bradley investigates the case of a famous explorer who has died while taking a bath at a country house gathering.

References

Bibliography
 Ebury, Katherine. Modern Literature and the Death Penalty, 1890-1950. Springer Nature, 2020.
 Reilly, John M. Twentieth Century Crime & Mystery Writers. Springer, 2015.

1929 British novels
Novels by Gladys Mitchell
British crime novels
Novels set in England
1929 debut novels
British detective novels
British novels adapted into television shows